The Fiat–Revelli Modello 1914 was an Italian water-cooled medium machine gun produced from 1914 to 1918. It was the standard machine-gun of the Italian Army in  World War I, and was used in limited numbers into World War II.

Overview
It was very similar to the Maxim in appearance (it had a similar-looking water-cooling jacket and tripod), even though its internal workings were completely different.

Some sources claim that it had a cartridge-oiling system, but the weapon manual does not mention its presence, and it seems that only a 1930 version briefly incorporated such a system. It was fed from a 50-round or 100-round magazine referred to as a "strip-feed box" which was divided into in ten or twenty compartments, each fed from a rifle clip, an arrangement that made it rather slow to reload, prone to malfunction and very uncomfortable in sustained-fire role because of this magazine arrangement.

One feature was the presence of select-fire, which allowed for the choice between single shot, "normal" fire and full automatic fire.

It was developed into the Fiat–Revelli Modello 1935.

The machine gun saw some use within armored vehicles, such as the Ansaldo Light Tank Prototype 1931, a precursor to the L3/33 tankette.

References

Sources

External links
 YouTube Animation showing mechanism of Fiat-Revelli machine gun
 YouTube Animation illustrating some additional features of Revelli mechanism

Further reading
 Manual (in Italian)

World War I Italian infantry weapons
World War II infantry weapons of Italy
Medium machine guns
World War I machine guns
World War II machine guns
Machine guns of Italy